Clemente Micara (24 December 1879 – 11 March 1965) was an Italian prelate of the Roman Catholic Church. He worked in the diplomatic service of the Holy See from 1909 to 1950 and was Vicar General of Rome from 1951 until his death.

Pope Pius XII made him a cardinal in 1946.

Biography
Born in Frascati, Micara attended the Pontifical Roman Seminary, the Pontifical Gregorian University, the Pontifical Lateran University, and the Pontifical Ecclesiastical Academy. He was ordained to the priesthood on 20 September 1902, and finished his studies in 1904. After entering the Roman Curia, in the Secretariat of State, in 1904, Micara was named secretary of the nunciature to Argentina in 1909. He was raised to the rank of Privy Chamberlain of His Holiness on 5 January 1910, and later Domestic Prelate of His Holiness on 21 August 1918. Micara was made auditor of the Belgian nunciature on 16 April 1915, and of the Austrian nunciature in 1916.

On 7 May 1920, he was appointed by Pope Benedict XV the first Nuncio to Czechoslovakia and Titular Archbishop of Apamea in Syria. He received his episcopal consecration on the following 8 August from Cardinal Pietro Gasparri, with Bishops Antonio Valbonesi and Karl Kašpar serving as co-consecrators, in the chapel of the Bohemian College in Rome. After being named Nuncio to Belgium and Internuncio to Luxembourg on 30 May 1923, Micara bestowed the Golden Rose on Queen Elizabeth of Belgium as a papal representative on 10 December 1925. He resided in Rome during the Nazi occupation of Belgium from 1940 to 1944, at which time the nuncio resumed his post.

Pope Pius XII named Micara Cardinal-Priest of Santa Maria sopra Minerva in the consistory of 18 February 1946, and then Bishop of Velletri-Segni on 13 June. On 11 November 1950, he was made Prefect of the Sacred Congregation of Religious, and Pro-Prefect of the Sacred Congregation of Rites in the Roman Curia.  In 1953, he resigned as Prefect of Religious (17 January) and Pro-Prefect of Rites (26 January). Micara was also President of the Pontifical Commission for Sacred Archaeology from 1951 until his death.

Micara was appointed Vice-Dean of the College of Cardinals on 13 January 1951 and Vicar General of Rome on the following 26 January. As Vicar General, Micara governed the Diocese of Rome on behalf of the Pope, the Bishop of Rome. For the 1953 Italian general election, Micara urged the Catholics of Rome to "[v]ote well, vote as Catholics, vote as Romans".

He served as a cardinal elector in the 1958 papal conclave that elected Pope John XXIII, and voted in the conclave of 1963 that elected Pope Paul VI. He was called the "Grand Elector" among the Curia because of his influential role in securing the votes of conservative cardinals' for Pope Paul, with whom he was friends, in the latter conclave. Seen as a progressive, the Cardinal attended the first three of the four sessions of the Second Vatican Council in 1962, 1963 and 1964.

He died on 11 March 1965 after a long illness in Rome, at age 85, and was buried in the basilica of Santa Maria sopra Minerva.

Honours 
 1924: Grand Cross of the Order of the White Lion
 1925: Grand Cordon Order of Leopold.

References

External links
Cardinals of the Holy Roman Church
Catholic-Hierarchy

1879 births
1965 deaths
People from Frascati
Apostolic Nuncios to Czechoslovakia
Apostolic Nuncios to Belgium
Apostolic Nuncios to Luxembourg
20th-century Italian cardinals
Cardinals created by Pope Pius XII
Participants in the Second Vatican Council
Pontifical Ecclesiastical Academy alumni
Pontifical Gregorian University alumni
Pontifical Lateran University alumni
Cardinal Vicars
Members of the Sacred Congregation for Rites
Members of the Congregation for Institutes of Consecrated Life and Societies of Apostolic Life
Pontifical Commission of Sacred Archaeology
Pontifical Roman Seminary alumni
Grand Crosses 1st class of the Order of Merit of the Federal Republic of Germany
Grand Crosses of the Order of the White Lion
Bishops appointed by Pope Benedict XV